Angélique and the King is a 1959 novel by Anne Golon and Serge Golon, the second novel in the Angélique series. Inspired by the life of Suzanne de Rougé du Plessis-Bellière, known as the Marquise du Plessis-Bellière. The novel is set during the Franco-Dutch War (1672-1678). 

Angélique's marriage to Jeoffrey de Peyrac is thought to be parallel to that of the daughter of Madame de Sévigné, Françoise-Marguerite de Sévigné to the Comte de Grignan.

There are some parallels between the career of Angélique's second husband, Philippe de Plessis du Bellière, and that of the historical Comte d'Artagnan, well-known through his fictionalized depiction in Alexandre Dumas's The Three Musketeers and its sequels. 

In 1966, the book was adapted into a film titled Angelique and the King.

Plot summary
After many trials, Angelique finally takes her place in Louis XIV's court alongside her new husband, who is the Marshal of France, Philippe de Plessis du Bellière. She has many problems with her new husband, who despises her for having blackmailed him into marriage. Eventually, she starts loving him (and vice versa) but he gets killed in the King's  war at the Low Countries. She earns the undivided attention of the King and there are even rumours that she may be his mistress. Her rival becomes Atenais de Montespan, the most recent favorite of the King, who plots against her. Angelique triumphs over her rival and even learns that her first husband, thought to be executed by the king himself, may still be alive. She resolves to find him at any cost.

1959 French novels
French historical novels
French romance novels
Novels set in Early Modern France
Novels set in the 1670s
French novels adapted into films
Works about Louis XIV